Gasimu Sheikh Kouyateh (born 7 May 1999) is a Liberian professional footballer who plays as a left-back for Liberian First Division club LISCR FC and the Liberia national team.

References 

1999 births
Living people
Sportspeople from Monrovia
Liberian footballers
Association football fullbacks
LISCR FC players
Liberian First Division players
Liberia international footballers